The 1968–69 Football League Cup was the ninth season of the Football League Cup, a knockout competition for England's top 92 football clubs. The competition ended with the final on 15 March 1969.

The final was contested by Third Division team Swindon Town and First Division side Arsenal at Wembley Stadium in London. Roger Smart gave Swindon a surprise lead in the first half but Bobby Gould equalised for Arsenal in the 85th minute. In extra-time, Don Rogers scored twice for Swindon, leading them to a 3–1 victory.

Calendar
Of the 91 teams, 37 received a bye to the second round (teams ranked 1st–38th in the 1967–68 Football League, excluding Manchester United who did not compete) and the other 54 played in the first round. Semi-finals were two-legged.

First round

Ties

Replays

Second Replays

Third replay

Second round

Ties

Replays

Third round

Ties

Replays

Fourth round

Ties

Replays

Fifth round

Ties

Replay

Semi-finals

First Leg

Second Leg

Replay

Final

The final was held at Wembley Stadium, London on 15 March 1969.

References

General

Specific

EFL Cup seasons
1968–69 domestic association football cups
Lea
Cup